Koh e Alburz, Romanized as Kuh i Elburz, Kohe Alborz, Kuh i Alborz  is a mountain of the Hindu Kush in Afghanistan. It is located in near Dey Chopan District Zabul Province.

The mountain should not be confused with another mountain spur with the same name. Kōh-e Alburz is a mountain spur 3206 m. It is situated in Zabul, Afghanistan. (32°39'54.14" N 66°29'50.39") 
Not far from this mountain lies in neighboring province two mountains under the name Maidan e Rustam ( Place of Rustam) in Ghazni.

References

Mountains of Afghanistan
Three-thousanders of the Hindu Kush
Landforms of Zabul Province